King Constantine may refer to:

 Constantine (Briton) (520–523), a king of Dumnonia in sub-Roman Britain
 Constantine I of Georgia (d. 1412), King of Georgia from 1405 or 1407 until his death
 Constantine II of Georgia (ca. 1447–1505), of the Bagrationi dynasty, king of Georgia from 1478
 Constantine I of Greece (1868–1923), King of Greece from 1913 to 1917 and from 1920 to 1922
 Constantine II of Greece (1940–2023), King of Greece from 1964 until abolition of the monarchy of Greece in 1973
 Constantine mac Fergusa (d. 820), a king of the Picts
 Constantine I of Scotland (d. 877), a king of the Picts
 Constantine II of Scotland (d. 952), an early King of Scotland
 Constantine III of Scotland (born ca. 970–997),  king of Scots from 995 to 997
 Constantine I, King of Armenia (r. 1298–1299, d. 1310)
 Constantine II, King of Armenia (r. 1342–1344), also called Guy
 Constantine III, King of Armenia (r. 1344–1362)
 Constantine IV, King of Armenia (r. 1362–1373)